Tahs or TAHS may refer to:

 The Alejandro Hernández Show, a Venezuelan web series
 Thomas Alleyne's High School, Uttoxeter, Staffordshire, England
 Turner Ashby High School, Bridgewater, Virginia, United States
 New South Wales Waratahs, an Australian rugby union football team

See also 
 Tah (disambiguation)